Brian May (28 July 1934 – 25 April 1997) was an Australian film composer and conductor who was a prominent figure during the Australian New Wave. He is perhaps best known for his scores to Mad Max and Mad Max 2.

Life and career 
May was born in Adelaide on 28 July 1934.  He trained at the Adelaide Elder Conservatorium as a pianist, violinist and conductor. He joined the ABC Adelaide in 1957 and was asked to form and conduct the ABC Adelaide Big Band, a full-blown ensemble that was rated as the best of the ABC state-based bands. He moved to Melbourne when he was 35 to arrange and conduct the ABC's Melbourne Show band. The Show Band made its radio debut on the First Network on 13 March 1969.  Background music for Australian television had previously been taken from records. May changed this by writing and arranging the themes for television programmes, including Bellbird, Return to Eden, The Last Frontier, A Dangerous Life and Darling of the Gods.

A breakthrough for May was the drama series Rush, set on the 19th-century Victorian goldfields. The theme was composed by Australian George Dreyfus, but May's arrangement of the theme was recorded by the Show Band and quickly reached the top of the Australian charts, selling more than 100,000 copies.  This type of success was usually reserved for pop groups such as Sherbert and Skyhooks.  May also composed the theme to the highly successful Countdown television series launched by the Melbourne Show Band. He left the ABC in 1984 and his interests turned to film music. He composed more than 30 feature film scores, including Frog Dreaming, Cloak and Dagger, Mad Max, Mad Max 2, Freddy's Dead: The Final Nightmare, Dr. Giggles and one episode of Tales from the Crypt.  May preferred to orchestrate his scores himself.

Death and legacy
May died in Melbourne on 25 April 1997 at the age of 62. At the time of his death, May left his collection of music manuscripts to Queensland University of Technology. The manuscripts have since been preserved by the National Library of Australia.

His will established the Brian May Trust, a charitable testamentary trust, to provide a scholarship to promising Australian film composers to study film-scoring at the University of Southern California (USC). The Trustees have determined that the scholarship will be provided for tuition in film-scoring at the USC's Thornton School of Music in the course known as the 'Scoring for Motion Pictures and Television Graduate Certificate'. The Brian May Trust Scholarship was first awarded for the 2003–2004 academic year. The scholarship later relocated to New York University's Steinhardt School.

Discography

Charting albums

Filmography

The True Story of Eskimo Nell (1975)
Patrick (1978)
 Mad Max (1979)
 Snapshot (1979)
 Thirst (1979)
 Twenty Good Years (1979)
 Harlequin (1980)
 Nightmares (1980)
 The Last Outlaw (1980)
 Roadgames (1981)
 The Survivor (1981)
 Gallipoli (1981) (additional music)
 Race for the Yankee Zephyr (1981)
 Mad Max 2 (1981)
 Breakfast in Paris (1982)
 Turkey Shoot (1982)
 Kitty and the Bagman (1983)
 A Slice of Life (1983)
 Cloak & Dagger (1984)
 Innocent Prey (1984)
 Missing in Action 2: The Beginning (1985)
 Frog Dreaming (1986)
 Sky Pirates (1986)
 Death Before Dishonor (1987)
 Steel Dawn (1987)
 Bloodmoon (1990)
 Dead Sleep (1990)
 Freddy's Dead: The Final Nightmare (1991)
 Dr. Giggles (1992)
 Hurricane Smith (1992)
 Blind Side (1993)

Awards
Mad Max won the Australian Film Institute Award for Best Original Score. May won many other awards, including the Golden Award from the Australian Performing Rights Association.

ARIA Music Awards
The ARIA Music Awards is an annual awards ceremony that recognises excellence, innovation, and achievement across all genres of Australian music. They commenced in 1987. 

! 
|-
| 1991
| Bloodmoon
| Best Original Soundtrack, Cast or Show Album
| 
| 
|-

References

External links

1934 births
1997 deaths
APRA Award winners
Australian film score composers
Male film score composers
Musicians from Adelaide
20th-century composers
20th-century Australian male musicians
20th-century Australian musicians
Varèse Sarabande Records artists